The 1997 FIBA Europe Under-16 Championship (known at that time as 1997 European Championship for Cadets) was the 14th edition of the FIBA Europe Under-16 Championship. The cities of Pepinster, Kortrijk and Quaregnon, in Belgium, hosted the tournament. Yugoslavia won the trophy for the sixth time, the first since the breakup of Yugoslavia.

Teams

Qualification

There were two qualifying rounds for this tournament. Twenty-three national teams entered the qualifying round. Fifteen teams advanced to the Challenge Round, where they joined Greece, Macedonia and Italy. The remaining eighteen teams were allocated in three groups of six teams each. The three top teams of each group joined Croatia (title holder), Spain (runner-up) and Belgium (host) in the final tournament.

Preliminary round
The twelve teams were allocated in two groups of six teams each.

Group A

Group B

Knockout stage

9th–12th playoffs

Championship

5th–8th playoffs

Final standings

Team roster
Ivan Mičeta, Slobodan Tošić, Ivan Vukadinov, Mladen Šekularac, Andrija Crnogorac, Vladimir Tica, Marko Peković, Vladimir Rončević, Sreten Lakonić, Predrag Stojić, Miljan Pavković, and Petar Jovanović.
Head coach: Veselin Matić.

References
FIBA Archive
FIBA Europe Archive

FIBA U16 European Championship
1997–98 in European basketball
1997 in Belgian sport
International youth basketball competitions hosted by Belgium